Harold Thomas Cottam (27 January 1891 – 30 May 1984) was a British wireless operator on the RMS Carpathia who fortuitously happened to receive the distress call from the sinking RMS Titanic on 15 April 1912. Cottam's decision to awaken Captain Arthur Henry Rostron and relay Titanics message in spite of the scepticism of the officer on watch allowed Carpathia to arrive at the scene hours before any other ship and is "credited with saving hundreds of lives." He was a personal friend of the Titanic's junior wireless operator and survivor Harold Bride.

Early life and career 

Cottam was born on 27 January 1891 in Southwell, Nottinghamshire to William Cottam and his wife Jane. He had four younger brothers.

At 17, Cottam left home to study eleven months at the British College of Telegraphy in London, becoming the school's youngest graduate in 1908. Afterward, he obtained a posting with the Marconi Company as second wireless operator on the RMS Empress of Ireland, sailing between Liverpool and Quebec. At the time, despite being stationed in a variety of locations on ship and land, wireless operators remained employees of the Marconi company.

As a Marconi employee, Cottam was subsequently assigned as a telegraphist at the British post office where, on separate occasions, he met and befriended both Jack Phillips and Harold Bride, who would later become the Titanics wireless operators. He also served as the wireless operator aboard the SS Medic, on which he made two voyages from Liverpool to Sydney, Australia.

Cottam had been employed by the Marconi Company for three years before joining the crew of the Carpathia in February 1912 as the ship's sole wireless operator.

RMS Titanic disaster

Initial communications with Titanic 

On the night of 14 April 1912, Cottam was on the Carpathias bridge reporting the day's communications, thus missing Titanics first distress calls shortly after midnight. Afterward, he listened to the receiver before going to bed, waiting for a confirmation of that afternoon's communication with the SS Parisian. While waiting, he received messages from Cape Cod, Massachusetts, stating they had private traffic for Titanic. Having heard Titanics wireless operator was overworked and because Carpathia was the nearest ship, he decided to "give him a hand."

Roughly ten minutes after Titanic first began transmitting CQD, the wireless distress signal, Cottam relayed Cape Cod's message to Titanic. In reply, he received a distress call from Titanics wireless officer Jack Phillips: "Come at once. We have struck a berg. It's a CQD, old man." To Cottam's question whether it was serious, Phillips reportedly replied, "Yes it's a CQD old man. Here's the position, report it, and get here as soon as you can."

At the Senate inquiry, Captain Arthur Rostron stated: "The whole thing was absolutely providential. I will tell you this, that the wireless operator was in his cabin, at the time, not on official business at all, but just simply listening as he was undressing. He was unlacing his boots at the time. He had this apparatus on his ear, and the message came. That was the whole thing. In 10 minutes, maybe he would have been in bed, and we would not have heard the messages."

Cottam took the message and coordinates to the bridge. According to Rostron's Senate testimony, both First Officer Horace Dean and Second Officer James G.P. Bisset were there on watch, although Rostron was reportedly asleep in his cabin at that time. Bisset's book and Cottam's 1956 BBC interview agree that only Dean was on watch, Bisset having already been relieved. Accounts differ on what happened next. According to Cottam in 1956, the officer on watch was slow to respond to the news. Cottam did not mention this point in either inquiry in 1912, nor in the news story he gave to the New York Times immediately upon landing in New York. Rostron also does not mention it. However, various sources have speculated why Dean might have questioned the report. Some cite CQD's status as an all-purpose distress call, not necessarily signifying loss of life. Others point out that since CQ by itself simply means "calling all stations", it is possible there was doubt whether Cottam heard the call correctly. It is also mentioned that, because SOS had been adopted in 1908 (although not widely used by this time), it might have been expected to hear that in a true emergency. Finally, because it had been widely vaunted that Titanic was unsinkable, it could have been reasoned that whatever danger the ship was in could not be critical.

Unable to convince Dean quickly enough, Cottam rushed down the ladder to the captain's cabin and awakened Rostron. Rostron testified at the Senate inquiry that both Cottam and Dean came to wake him. Rostron immediately "gave the order to turn the ship around," and then "asked the operator if he was absolutely sure it was a distress signal from the Titanic." Cottam said that he had "received a distress signal from the Titanic, requiring immediate assistance," gave Titanic's position, and said that "he was absolutely certain of the message." Whilst dressing, Rostron set a course for Titanic, and sent for the chief engineer and told "him to call another watch of stokers and make all possible speed to the Titanic, as she was in trouble."

Cottam, meanwhile, messaged the Titanic that Carpathia was "coming as quickly as possible and expect to be there within four hours." Second Officer Bisset writes that Cottam refrained from sending more signals after this, trying to keep the air clear for Titanics distress signals. However, Cottam testified that while Carpathia sped to Titanics position, he was kept busy relaying messages from other ships in the area that Phillips was having difficulty hearing because of noise from the sinking ship. He also delivered updates to the bridge.

Final calls and sinking 

Around 1:45 a.m., Cottam received Titanics final intelligible message: "Come as quickly as possible, old man, the engine room is filling up to the boilers." He replied that "all our boats were ready and we were coming as hard as we could come" but received no further response. The British Wreck Commissioner's inquiry found that other ships in the area continued to hear broken or unintelligible CQD and SOS calls from Titanic after the last message Cottam received, but all signals cut off abruptly at 2:17 a.m., three minutes before Titanic disappeared under the water. Despite receiving no reply, Cottam continued to update Titanic on Carpathias progress, instructing Phillips to look for their signal rockets.

Rescue and aftermath 

Carpathia arrived at the distress position shortly after 4:00 a.m., approximately an hour and a half after the Titanic went down, and five hours before any other ship. Cottam recalled seeing floating wood and debris at the scene, but no bodies. For the next four and a half hours, the ship took on the 705 survivors from Titanics 20 lifeboats before setting course for New York.

From the morning of 14 April before the disaster, to the evening of 18 April, when Carpathia arrived in New York, Cottam did not go off duty and slept less than ten hours. He testified to the Senate that the first four days, he worked almost non-stop around the clock, only falling asleep unintentionally once at his desk for three hours on the night of 16 April. In 1913, Rostron wrote that about 4:30 p.m. Monday 15 April, Carpathia responded to a request for information by RMS Olympic by sending "bare facts" and names of survivors, as well as official messages to the Cunard company, which took until 1:00 a.m. when Carpathia was out of range. He went on, "It was most difficult to get the names even, and the continuous strain at the instrument, the conditions under which the operator was working, and the constant interruptions made it anything but a simple matter."

By either Tuesday or Wednesday evening (the testimony of Bride and Cottam differs on this point), Harold Bride, Titanics junior wireless operator, had come to assist Cottam, in spite of serious foot injuries he had incurred in the disaster. Cottam and Bride worked together, relaying official messages about the disaster and survivors to ships in the area, as well as messages to and from relatives of Titanic passengers. On Rostron's order, they ignored inquiries from journalists. Afterward, both Cottam and Bride stated that the volume of official and passenger messages was so great that they would not have had time to respond to media requests anyway.

Immediately upon Carpathia's arrival in New York, Cottam told the Senate inquiry, he received his employer's permission to meet with the New York Times, which bought his story for $750. The story, "Titanic's "C.Q.D." Caught by a Lucky Fluke", was published the next day.

Inquiries 

In April and May 1912, first in New York and then in Washington, D.C., Cottam was called on to testify on multiple occasions before the U.S. Senate inquiry into the disaster. Upon returning to England, he testified on 12 May 1912 before the British Wreck Commissioner's inquiry in London.

Questions to Cottam at the inquiries sought to establish the disaster's timeline of events and standard wireless procedures, as well as wireless operators' obligations in emergency situations. Questioners also cited conflicting news reports and miscommunications from the various ships in the vicinity of the disaster and in communication with Carpathia. They asked numerous questions regarding whether Cottam had communicated with journalists or received instructions from the Marconi Company or one of the shipping lines not to share information he had been instructed to send. Cottam testified that, although he was an employee of the Marconi Company, aboard ship, the captain's orders superseded those of the company.

Findings and criticism 

The Senate inquiry found Cottam did not show "proper vigilance" in handling official information during the Carpathias return to New York, citing a telegram from Bruce Ismay, chairman of the White Star Line, to Philip Franklin, who was in charge of the White Star Line's New York office. According to the inquiry's report, although Carpathias purser gave the message to Cottam the morning of 15 April, it was not sent until the morning of 17 April, via Halifax, despite specific instructions from Rostron via the purser to send the message as early as possible. The report suggested that a previous incident of a different wireless operator using disaster information to their own advantage, together with Cottam's motivation to sell his story to reporters, "subjects the participants to criticism, and the practice should be prohibited." This line of reasoning, among others, came under criticism from other members of the investigating committee, who threatened to quit over Senator William Alden Smith's handling of the investigation. During the course of the investigation, it was revealed that the message had been transmitted with the first bundle of messages sent when Carpathia regained contact with shore.

The British Wreck Commissioner's inquiry report made no remark about Cottam beyond noting that the Carpathia received and responded to Titanics distress call.

Recognition and legacy 

The fact that Cottam had received Titanics distress calls by chance, while the SS Californian, which was much closer, missed the calls entirely (its wireless operator being asleep) added to the evidence for consistent safety measures regarding wireless and led to the Radio Act of 1912, requiring all ships to man wireless distress frequencies around the clock.

Cottam received a "hero's welcome" when the Carpathia reached New York. For their rescue work, the crew of Carpathia were later awarded medals by the Titanic Survivors Committee. Crew members were awarded bronze medals, officers silver, and Captain Rostron a silver cup and a gold medal, presented by Margaret 'Molly' Brown.

Cottam was modest about his role in the disaster and, outside a few interviews, rarely spoke of it to friends and family, preferring privacy.

He turned down an offer to play himself in the 1958 film A Night to Remember. The role went to Alec McCowen. In 1979, he was portrayed by Christopher Strauli in S. O. S. Titanic.

Cottam's crucial role in the disaster was honored in 2013 with a blue plaque on the wall of The Old Ship Inn in Lowdham, Nottinghamshire, where he lived after retiring. The plaque reads:

Later life 

Cottam continued to work as a shipboard wireless operator on various ships until 1922, when he married Elsie Jean Shepperson and took a job as a sales representative of the Mini Max Fire Extinguisher company.

Cottam and his wife had four children, William, Jean, Sybil and Angus. Angus died in the late 1960s.

Cottam retired and, in 1958, moved to Lowdham, Nottinghamshire, where he died in 1984.

Notes

References 

1891 births
1984 deaths
British radio people
People from Southwell, Nottinghamshire
RMS Titanic
People from Lowdham